Housing and Building National Research Center (HBRC) (in Arabic :  المركز القومي لبحوث الإسكان والبناء ) is an Egyptian agency affiliated to Ministry of Housing

History
On 21 June 1954, a cooperation agreement on the establishment of the Institute for building researches in cooperation with the Department of Foreign Affairs of the United States of America government was signed. Act No. 495 was issued on 23 September 1954 to establish the Institute for building researches in Egypt as an independent organization.
In 1971, decision number 1871 was issued from the Prime Minister stating the affiliation of the Institute to the Ministry of Housing, Utilities and Urban Development.
On 16 February 2005, two presidential decrees No. 63 and No. 64 for the year 2005 were issued to reorganize the Housing and Building Center and its name become Housing and Building National Research Center affiliated to the Minister of Housing, Utilities and Urban Development.

HBRC institutes  

 Building Materials and Quality Control Research Institute
 Concrete Construction Research Institute
 Structure and Metallic Construction Research Institute
 Soil Mechanics and Geo-technical Engineering Research Institute
 Sanitary and Environmental Engineering Research Institute
 Construction Engineering and Construction Management Research Institute
 Architecture and Housing Research Institute
 Raw Materials and Technological Processing Research Institute
 Building Physics and Environment Research Institute
 Electro-mechanical Research Institute 
 The Urban Training and Studies Institute (UTI)

External links
 Official website

References 

Government agencies of Egypt
Research institutes in Egypt
Building research